Denial of pregnancy (also called pregnancy denial) is a form of denial exhibited by women to either the fact or the implications of their own pregnancy. One study found that women who denied their pregnancy represented 0.26% of all deliveries.   A later study cited an incidence at 20 weeks gestation of approximately 1 in 475, and said that the proportion of cases persisting until delivery is about 1 in 2500 pregnancies.

Psychotic denial
This is a form of denial that is so extreme as to fall under the category of delusion. Physical symptoms of pregnancy can be absent or not perceived by the woman. When they occur, they are misinterpreted. Some women interpret the sensation of something growing inside them as cancer, or a blood clot. Some women might believe fetal movements are their organs coming loose inside their body.

See also
Cryptic pregnancy
False pregnancy

References

Further reading

Pathology of pregnancy, childbirth and the puerperium